Sarcodon umbilicatus is a species of tooth fungus in the family Bankeraceae. Found in Belize, where it grows on the ground under oaks in mountainous cloud forest, it was described as new to science in 2015.

References

External links
 

Fungi described in 2015
Fungi of Central America
umbilicatus